Walter Estrada Degrandi (1924 – 1990) was a Uruguayan chess player, nine-time Uruguayan Chess Championship winner (1953, 1959, 1960, 1961, 1966, 1967, 1973, 1977, 1979).

Biography
From the 1950s to the 1970s Walter Estrada Degrandi was one of Uruguayan leading chess players. He nine time won Uruguayan Chess Championships: 1953, 1959, 1960, 1961, 1966, 1967, 1973, 1977, and 1979. Walter Estrada Degrandi three times participated in World Chess Championship South American Zonal tournaments (1954, 1960, 1978).

Walter Estrada Degrandi played for Uruguay in the Chess Olympiads:
 In 1962, at first board in the 15th Chess Olympiad in Varna (+3, =4, -9),
 In 1978, at first board in the 23rd Chess Olympiad in Buenos Aires (+1, =1, -4).

Walter Estrada Degrandi played for Uruguay in the Pan American Team Chess Championships:
 In 1971, at third board in the 1st Panamerican Team Chess Championship in Tucuman (+1, =1, -3).

References

External links

Walter Estrada Degrandi chess games at 365chess.com

1930 births
2007 deaths
Uruguayan chess players
Chess Olympiad competitors
20th-century chess players